Paweł Sasin (born 2 October 1983 in Radom) is a Polish professional footballer who plays as a full-back or a defensive midfielder for Polonia Nysa.

Career

Club
In February 2011, he was released from Cracovia.

After leaving Cracovia, he joined Górnik Łęczna.

In July 2011, he signed a contract with Warta Poznań and moved to ŁKS Łódź on 10 January 2012.

National team
Sasin is a former member of the Poland U21.

References

External links
 

Polish footballers
Poland under-21 international footballers
People from Radom
Living people
1983 births
Sportspeople from Masovian Voivodeship
Association football midfielders
Korona Kielce players
Lech Poznań players
Śląsk Wrocław players
MKS Cracovia (football) players
Górnik Łęczna players
Warta Poznań players
ŁKS Łódź players
Ząbkovia Ząbki players
Arka Gdynia players
Ekstraklasa players
I liga players
II liga players